The Merton Bernfield Memorial Award, formerly known as the Member Memorial Award
For Graduate Students and Postdoctoral Fellows, was established in memory of deceased colleagues donations from members of the American Society for Cell Biology. The winner is selected on merit and is invited to speak in Minisymposium at the ASCB Annual Meeting. The winner also receives financial support.

Awardees
Source: 

2019 Veena Padmanaban
2018 Kelsie Eichel
2017 Lawrence Kazak
2016 Kara McKinley
2015 Shigeki Watanabe
2014 Prasanna Satpute-Krishnan
2013 Panteleimon Rompolas
2012 Ting Chen and Gabriel Lander
2011 Dylan Tyler Burnette
2010 Hua Jin
2009 Chad G. Pearson
2008 Kenneth Campellone
2007 Ethan Garner
2006 Lloyd Trotman
2005 Stephanie Gupton
2004 Chun Han
2003 Erik Dent
2002 Christina Hull
2001 Sarah South and James Wohlschlegel

See also

 List of biology awards

References

American Society for Cell Biology
Biology awards
American science and technology awards
Awards established in 2001